Woodlands is a heritage-listed residence at 44 King Street, East Maitland, City of Maitland, New South Wales, Australia. It was added to the New South Wales State Heritage Register on 2 April 1999.

History 

Woodlands was built in 1843 by J. Chamber. A central hallway and main entrance for both Woodlands and the conjoined and also-heritage listed Goonoobah was built in 1896, before both buildings were converted into a complex of three flats in 1930.

Description

It forms one of two conjoined sandstone cottages in the Victorian Georgian style built on different alignments, along with neighbouring Goonoobah, which is closer to the street than Woodlands. It features shuttered French windows, cast iron decoration to the verandah, and bullnosed verandah roof. The main roof is hipped and of iron and has three later unsympathetic dormer windows to the front and sides.

Heritage listing 

Woodlands was listed on the New South Wales State Heritage Register on 2 April 1999.

See also

References

Attribution 

New South Wales State Heritage Register
East Maitland, New South Wales
Houses in New South Wales
Articles incorporating text from the New South Wales State Heritage Register